Goran Maksimović (born 27 July 1963 in Svetozarevo) is a Serbian sport shooter and Olympic Champion for Yugoslavia. He won a gold medal in the 10 metre air rifle event at the 1988 Summer Olympics in Seoul. At the 1996 and 2000 Olympics he competed for FR Yugoslavia.

Goran is currently the head coach of the Serbian national shooting team. His daughter, Ivana Maksimović, is a 2012 Olympic silver medalist.

References

External links
 

1963 births
Living people
Yugoslav male sport shooters
Serbian male sport shooters
ISSF rifle shooters
Olympic shooters of Yugoslavia
Olympic gold medalists for Yugoslavia
Shooters at the 1984 Summer Olympics
Shooters at the 1988 Summer Olympics
Shooters at the 1992 Summer Olympics
Shooters at the 1996 Summer Olympics
Shooters at the 2000 Summer Olympics
Olympic medalists in shooting

Medalists at the 1988 Summer Olympics
Mediterranean Games silver medalists for Yugoslavia
Competitors at the 1991 Mediterranean Games
Mediterranean Games medalists in shooting